In Aztec mythology, Tepēyōllōtl ("heart of the mountains"; also Tepeyollotli) was the god of darkened caves, earthquakes, echoes and jaguars. He is the god of the Eighth Hour of the Night, and is depicted as a jaguar leaping towards the sun. In the calendar, Tepeyollotl rules over both the third day, Calli (house), and the third trecena, 1-Mazatl (deer).

Tepeyollotl is usually depicted as cross-eyed holding the typical white staff with green feathers. Sometimes Tezcatlipoca wore Tepeyollotl for an animal skin or disguise to trick other gods into not knowing who he was.

References

Aztec gods
Nature gods
Mythological felines